Rosemary Brown  (née Wedderburn; June 17, 1930 – April 26, 2003) was a Canadian politician. She was the first black woman elected to the provincial government of British Columbia.

Early years
Rosemary Brown was born in Kingston, Jamaica, in 1930. She came to Canada in the year 1951 to attend university. She proceeded to earn a Master of Social Work at the University of British Columbia. As a student at McGill, and later the University of British Columbia, she faced pervasive discrimination. It was through adversity that she found her purpose as a leader against racism and sexism. She helped to found the British Columbia Association for the Advancement of Coloured People (BCAACP) in 1956 to help advocate for housing, employment and human rights legislation.

Political history
Brown served as a Member of the Legislative Assembly (MLA) in the British Columbia legislature as a part of the New Democratic Party from 1972 to 1986, making her the first Black Canadian woman to be elected to a Canadian provincial legislature.

During that time, she advocated for Canadian minorities and changed the legislature to uphold equality. She worked on improving "services for the elderly, the disadvantaged, immigrants and people with disabilities"  as well as prohibiting discrimination on the basis of race or sex.

In 1972, she became the first black woman to run for the leadership of a Canadian federal party (and only the second woman, after Mary Walker-Sawka), finishing a strong second (with 40.1% of the votes on the fourth and final ballot) to Ed Broadbent in that year's New Democratic Party leadership election.

After departing politics, she became a professor of women's studies at Simon Fraser University. In 1993, she was appointed Chief Commissioner of the Ontario Human Rights Commission and served until 1996. In 1995, she was awarded the Order of British Columbia and in 1996 was named an Officer of the Order of Canada.

Brown was sworn to the Queen's Privy Council for Canada as a member of the Federal Security Intelligence Review Committee, responsible for overseeing the actions of the Canadian Security Intelligence Service, a role which she held from 1993 to 1998. She also served on the Order of Canada Advisory Committee from 1999 until her death in 2003.

Honours and awards
 National Black Coalition Award, 1972
 United Nations Human Rights Fellowship, 1973
 YWCA Woman of Distinction Award, 1989
 Order of British Columbia, 1995 
 Order of Canada, 1996 
 Government of Jamaica Commander of the Order of Distinction, 2001
 Canadian Labour Congress Award for Outstanding Service to Humanity, 2002 
 15 honorary doctorate degrees from Canadian Universities  including UBC, 1995.

Death
She died of a heart attack aged 72, in Vancouver, British Columbia in 2003.

Legacy
Canada Post featured Brown on a Canadian postage stamp released on February 2, 2009.

On June 17, 2005, a park in Brown's former provincial riding of Vancouver-Burrard was dedicated to and named for her.

In 2021 a new public school in the Durham District School board in Ontario was named Rosemary Brown Public School.

A recreation centre to be named for Brown is under construction at 10th Avenue and 18th Street in the Edmonds neighbourhood of Burnaby and is slated to open in 2022.

Bibliography
Brown, Rosemary. Being Brown: A Very Public Life. Toronto: Random House, 1989.

References

1930 births
2003 deaths
Black Canadian politicians
British Columbia New Democratic Party MLAs
Canadian activists
Emigrants from British Jamaica to Canada
McGill University School of Social Work alumni
Members of the Order of British Columbia
Members of the King's Privy Council for Canada
Officers of the Order of Canada
Academic staff of Simon Fraser University
Women MLAs in British Columbia
Canadian autobiographers
Politicians from Kingston, Jamaica
Politicians from Vancouver
Black Canadian women
20th-century Canadian women politicians
Women autobiographers
History of Black people in British Columbia
University of British Columbia School of Social Work alumni